A branch, sometimes called a ramus in botany, is a woody structural member connected to the central trunk of a tree (or sometimes a shrub). Large branches are known as boughs and small branches are known as twigs. The term twig usually refers to a terminus, while bough refers only to branches coming directly from the trunk.

Due to a broad range of species of trees, branches and twigs can be found in many different shapes and sizes. While branches can be nearly horizontal, vertical, or diagonal, the majority of trees have upwardly diagonal branches. A number of mathematical properties are associated with tree branchings; they are natural examples of fractal patterns in nature, and, as observed by Leonardo da Vinci, their cross-sectional areas closely follow the da Vinci branching rule.

Terminology
Because of the enormous quantity of branches in the world, there are numerous names in English alone for them. In general however, unspecific words for a branch (such as rise) have been replaced by the word branch itself.

Specific terms
A bough can also be called a limb or arm, and though these are arguably metaphors, both are widely accepted synonyms for bough. A crotch or fork is an area where a trunk splits into two or more boughs. A twig is frequently referred to as a sprig as well, especially when it has been plucked. Other words for twig include branchlet, spray, and surcle, as well as the technical terms surculus and ramulus. Branches found under larger branches can be called underbranches.

Some branches from specific trees have their own names, such as osiers and withes or withies, which come from willows. Often trees have certain words which, in English, are naturally collocated, such as holly and mistletoe, which usually employ the phrase "sprig of" (as in, a "sprig of mistletoe"). Similarly, the branch of a cherry tree is generally referred to as a "cherry branch", while other such formations (i.e., "acacia branch" or "orange branch") carry no such alliance. A good example of this versatility is oak, which could be referred to as variously an  "oak branch", an "oaken branch", a "branch of oak", or the "branch of an oak tree".

Once a branch has been cut or in any other way removed from its source, it is most commonly referred to as a stick, and a stick employed for some purpose (such as walking, spanking, or beating) is often called a rod. Thin, flexible sticks are called switches, wands, shrags, or vimina (singular vimen).

History and etymology

Numerous other words for twigs and boughs abound, including , which still survives as the "-toe" in mistletoe.

Latin words for branch are ramus or cladus. The latter term is an affix found in other modern words such as cladodonts (prehistoric sharks with branched teeth) or cladogram.

See also

 Basal shoot
 Plant stem
 Root
 Shoot
 Stolon
 Switch (corporal punishment)
 Trunk (botany)
 Turion (botany)
 Twig
 Wand

References

Plant morphology

ja:分枝 (生物学)